Dicranum leioneuron is a species of moss belonging to the family Dicranaceae.

It is native to Northern Hemisphere.

References

Dicranales